Sullivan Stapleton (born 14 June 1977) is an Australian actor who is best known for his roles in the television series The Secret Life of Us, Strike Back and Animal Kingdom.  He also starred in the NBC crime drama Blindspot.

Stapleton played the lead role, Greek leader Themistocles, in the film 300: Rise of an Empire (2014). In 2013, he was honoured with a Breakthrough Award at an exclusive Australians in Film Benefit Dinner held in Los Angeles.

Early life
Stapleton was born in Melbourne, Victoria. He was eight years old when he and his younger sister, actress Jacinta Stapleton, six at the time, joined an acting and modelling agency. The idea first came to their aunt who signed her kids with the agency. She then asked her nephew and nieces if they would like to join and their mother signed them in. Stapleton's younger brother Joshua also launched into acting in early childhood; as well as acting, he pursued talents in dance and musical theatre.

Stapleton's picture caught the attention of a director who invited him to be in his short film (about high school dropouts at a party where girls were dying, without the graphic violence). Pleased by his performance, the director said he was gifted and encouraged him to pursue acting.

Stapleton received training at Melbourne's St. Martin's Theatre. He studied drama and theatre at Sandringham Secondary College (in Sandringham, Victoria, Australia).

Career
Stapleton launched his career in Australia. He got his actors' union card at the age of 9 and at 11 he started working in ads. Stapleton's first onscreen acting performance was in the 1994 Australian TV-movie Baby Bath Massacre as Adrian. Between acting jobs, Stapleton did several types of work: modeling, cleaning animal cages in a pet shop, and working as a grip in many films and TV productions. In 1995, Sullivan appeared in Blue Heelers for one episode, and again in 2003 for 3 episodes. (The Elephant Princess, Rush, Tangle) in front and behind the camera, working on building sites, and assisting carpenters.

Before landing a role as Josh Hughes in Australian soap opera Neighbours in 1998, he appeared in a string of little-seen features and homegrown dramas. Other notable roles include Justin Davies in the Australian televised serial The Secret Life of Us (between 2003 and 2005), Fearless in the motion picture December Boys (released in 2007), special agent Wilkins in the mainstream feature, The Condemned (an American action film distributed in 2007). But it was with Stapleton's performance in the Academy Award-nominated film Animal Kingdom, which premiered at the 2010 Sundance Film Festival, that he made an international breakthrough.

When Animal Kingdom won the Grand Jury Prize at the Sundance Film Festival interest in him sparked on two continents and his career has taken him across the globe. He made his second appearance in Underbelly, an Australian true crime drama television series, this time as the lead character, Colin McLaren in Underbelly Files: Infiltration. This was an endurance test for Stapleton and the first challenging shoot of his career. Previously he played Pat Barbaro in Underbelly (episode Suffer the Children) in 2008.

In early 2014, Stapleton was in Thailand for the filming of the TV series Strike Back. In February, on a night out in Bangkok after work, he fell off a tuk-tuk and suffered a head injury that left him in a coma. He was resuscitated by former UFC Middleweight Champion Michael Bisping, with whom he had been spending his night out. Shooting for the show was paused for six months to allow his full recovery. Airing of the fifth season was also pushed to 2015.

Filmography

Film

Television

References

External links
 
 

1977 births
Australian male film actors
Australian male television actors
Living people
20th-century Australian male actors
21st-century Australian male actors
Male actors from Melbourne
Australian expatriate male actors in the United States